The surname Dikmen may refer to:

 Aydın Dikmen (born 1937), Turkish art dealer
 Ayla Dikmen (1944–1990), Turkish female singer
 İlkay Dikmen (born 1981), Turkish female swimmer
 Songül Dikmen (born 1981), Turkish female volleyball player
 Şükriye Dikmen (1918–2000), Turkish painter
 Volkan Dikmen (born 1991), Turkish foodwaller 
 Nathalie Dikmen famous volleyball player and doctor

Turkish-language surnames